Leslie Lynch King may refer to:

 Leslie Lynch King Sr. (1884–1941), biological father of U.S. President Gerald Ford
 Leslie Lynch King Jr. (1913–2006), known from childhood as Gerald Ford, 38th President of the United States, and son of Leslie Lynch King Sr.